Emmanuel College is a secondary school and sixth form college (years 7-13) based in Gateshead, England.  It was founded in 1990 as a City Technology College, i.e. a secondary school which is partly funded by donations from business donors who remain involved in management of the college. Emmanuel is currently one of the three remaining City Technology Colleges in England as the remainder have converted to academies. Emmanuel has up to 1,350 students aged between 11 and 19, and over 160 staff. It is  part of Emmanuel Schools Foundation and in each of its four Ofsted inspections it has achieved a status of "Outstanding School".

Students come from a wide variety of socio-economic backgrounds but predominantly from the urban areas within Gateshead and Central and West Newcastle upon Tyne.

Intake policy

The college was described by The Guardian in 2002 as achieving "consistently outstanding academic results", having received a "glowing" Ofsted report.

By law, the school must admit pupils of mixed ability, according to a normal distribution representative of the whole population. In common with other City Technology Colleges, Emmanuel College uses non-verbal reasoning tests set and marked by the National Foundation for Educational Research, a leading independent research organisation, to assess general intelligence, as opposed to prowess in literacy or mathematics. After marking, the NFER places test results into nine separate categories, and informs the school how many are to be taken from each category.

Another condition is that two-thirds of places are given to students considered to be from the most socio-economically deprived wards within its catchment area, with the other third coming from other areas of the catchment area, ensuring a mix not only academically but socially too.

In terms of Sixth Form admission, a reduced number of places available (130) are offered, with preference to the school's own Year 11 students.

Controversies

Creationism

The school was at the centre of protests from scientists and educationalists when it was revealed that some members of the management team, including both the principal and the head of science, were sympathetic to Young Earth creationism and had allowed its hall to be rented by Answers in Genesis, an organisation which promotes such views. The school includes evolutionary science in its curriculum, but presents evolution as a theory complemented by the theory of creationism (taught in RE lessons). This led to allegations by Richard Dawkins, John Polkinghorne, and others in 2002 that the school taught creationism in science lessons. In 2002, the Liberal Democrat MP Jenny Tonge asked Prime Minister Tony Blair if he was "happy to allow the teaching of creationism alongside Darwin's theory of evolution in state schools". Blair replied that he supported a "diverse school system", and praised the teachers at Emmanuel College for their commitments to "deliver[ing] better results for our children".

However, after re-inspecting the material used to teach science at Emmanuel College, Ofsted decided that the matter did not need to be pursued further.
The next Ofsted inspection in 2006 described the school as 'Outstanding' and found no problem with its science provision.

Some allegations centred on the school's former head of science, Steven Layfield, who had, prior to his taking up the post, publicly advocated the teaching of Intelligent Design in schools in 2000.

Gross misconduct allegation

In the academic year 2013–2014, former teacher of history Mr Daniel McQuoid (son of former principal Nigel McQuoid) engaged in gross misconduct with an 18-year-old student who had left the school; as a result, he resigned in 2014. It was subsequently investigated by both the police and the National College for Teaching and Leadership, which found that there was no evidence of matters serious enough for either police prosecution or for him having any limitations on his ability to teach again.

Authoritarian ethos

In 2003, former teacher of music Cormack O'Duffy painted a negative picture of the college during a discussion with TES journalist Michael Shaw. O'Duffy was discharged of his position for disobeying an order from the then principal Nigel McQuoid for vocally voicing his concerns about the school; however, O'Duffy's union provided legal support and the case against him was dropped. During the interview, O'Duffy described the school as a place of 'eerie silence' and an institution of immense regulation: "With its quiet atmosphere, you might easily think you had entered the set of a James Bond movie where all the workers at the plant are focused on a task and have no time for frivolity." Furthermore, O'Duffy raised concerns about the nature of the Christian ethos claiming an over-emphasis on hell.

Notable alumni
 Michelle Heaton, pop singer, former member of Liberty X
 Sean Tomes, former Rugby Union player for Newcastle Falcons
 Jonny Rowell, professional footballer who has played in the Belgian Pro League
 Benjamin Satterley, professional wrestler currently signed to All Elite Wrestling and previously with WWE
 Jay Gardner, reality TV star formerly of Geordie Shore

Other Emmanuel Schools

References

External links 
 Emmanuel College, official website
Department for Children, Schools and Families – EduBase2 – Emmanuel College

City technology colleges in England
Secondary schools in Gateshead
Educational institutions established in 1990
1990 establishments in England
Emmanuel Schools Foundation